Arie de Vroet (9 November 1918 – 9 September 1999) was a Dutch footballer who was active as a left winger. De Vroet made his debut at Feijenoord and also played for Le Havre AC and FC Rouen. He also represented the Netherlands at the 1948 Summer Olympics.

Honours
 1940-41 : Eredivisie winner with Feijenoord

References

External links
De Vroet at fr-fanatic.com Feijenoord fansite (Dutch)

1918 births
1999 deaths
Dutch footballers
Netherlands international footballers
Dutch expatriate footballers
Feyenoord players
Le Havre AC players
FC Rouen players
Eredivisie players
Ligue 1 players
Ligue 2 players
Expatriate footballers in France
Footballers at the 1948 Summer Olympics
Olympic footballers of the Netherlands
Association football forwards
Dutch football managers
Dutch expatriate football managers
Be Quick 1887 managers
Le Havre AC managers
People from Oud-Beijerland
Expatriate football managers in France
SV SVV managers
VV DOS managers
Footballers from South Holland
Dutch expatriate sportspeople in France